Chinnasekkadu is a neighbourhood of Chennai in Chennai district in the state of Tamil Nadu, India. Chinnasekkadu used to be a town panchayat in Thiruvallur district. In 2011, Chinnasekkadu town panchayat was merged with Chennai Corporation. Chinnasekkadu comes under ward 29 in Zone 3(Madhavaram) of Chennai Corporation.

Geography
It has an average elevation of 11 metres (36 feet).

Demographics
 India census, Chinnasekkadu had a population of 9744. Males constitute 52% of the population and females 48%. Chinnasekkadu has an average literacy rate of 75%, higher than the national average of 59.5%; with male literacy of 81% and female literacy of 69%. 12% of the population is under 6 years of age.

References

Neighbourhoods in Chennai
Cities and towns in Tiruvallur district